The 1958 Prairie View A&M Panthers football team was an American football team that represented Prairie View A&M University in the Southwestern Athletic Conference (SWAC) during the 1958 NCAA College Division football season. In their tenth season under head coach Billy Nicks, the Panthers compiled a 10–0–1 record, won the SWAC championship, and outscored opponents by a total of 369 to 101. In two post-season games, they defeated Florida A&M in the Orange Blossom Classic and Langston in the Prairie View Bowl. The Panthers were recognized as the 1958 black college national champion.

Schedule

References

Prairie View AandM
Prairie View A&M Panthers football seasons
Black college football national champions
Southwestern Athletic Conference football champion seasons
College football undefeated seasons
Prairie View AandM Football